Albert Bouvet (28 February 1930 – 20 May 2017) was a French professional cyclist.  He won Paris–Tours in 1956 and remained the last Frenchman to win until Jacky Durand won in 1998. His name is also associated with Paris–Roubaix, as an organiser and discoverer of new sections of pavé.

The Albert Bouvet Trophy is a race between Saint Gregory and Saint-Georges-de-Reintembault in Ille et Vilaine.

Palmarès

Wins 
 Champion of France, Individual pursuit: 1958, 1959, 1960, 1962, 1963 (2nd: 1961)
 Champion of France, Individual pursuit (for Winter): 1957
 Paris–Tours: 1956
 Circuit Boucles de la Seine: 1955
 Circuit Finistère: 1956
 Boucles du Bas-Limousin: 1955
 Tour de l'Orne: 1954
 Manche-Océan: 1954 (2nd: 1955, 1957 3rd: 1956)
 Grand Prix de France (as an amateur): 1953

Other significant results 
 2nd Individual pursuit World Championships: 1957, 1959
 2nd Grand Prix des Nations: 1955, 1956
 2nd Tour de Champagne: 1955
 2nd Grand Prix de Suisse (TT): 1955
 2nd Grand Prix de Cannes: 1960
 2nd Boucles de l'Aulne: 1957
 2nd l'Omnium des Nations à Daumesnil: 1958 (with Louison Bobet)
 3rd Four Days of Dunkirk: 1956
 3rd Grand Prix de Lugano: 1956
 3rd Grand Prix de Fourmies: 1959
 3rd Grand Prix of Algiers: 1959
 3rd Grand Prix Longines (TT): 1959
 3rd Grand Prix Parisien (TT): 1962
 3rd Boucles Roquevairoises: 1960
 4th Bordeaux–Paris: 1957

References

1930 births
2017 deaths
French male cyclists
Sportspeople from Ille-et-Vilaine
Cyclists from Brittany